Kenan Memorial Stadium is a stadium located in Chapel Hill, North Carolina and is the home field of the North Carolina Tar Heels. It is primarily used for football. The stadium opened in 1927 and holds 50,500 people. It is located near the center of campus at the University of North Carolina.

History
The previous home of the Tar Heels was Emerson Field, which opened in 1916 on the current site of Davis Library. By 1925, it was obvious that that 2,400-seat facility was not adequate for the increasing crowds.  Expansion was quickly ruled out since the baseball team also used it. Any new football seats would have also been too far away for baseball.

Funding for the stadium was originally supposed to come from alumni donations.   William R. Kenan Jr., a UNC alumnus, scientist, industrialist and dairy farmer from Lockport, New York who would later become a prominent businessman in Miami, got word of the initial plans and donated a large gift to build the stadium and an adjoining field house.  Kenan was an 1894 UNC graduate and grandson of one of UNC's original trustees. Kenan persuaded UNC to build the stadium as a memorial to his parents, William R. Kenan and Mary Hargrave Kenan.

Local architect TC Atwood designed the stadium; he would later design Georgia's Sanford Stadium along lines similar to Kenan. For instance, Sanford's famous hedges were copied from Kenan.

Ground was broken in November 1926.  The stadium was completed in August 1927.  At the time, it was located on the far southern portion of campus, but expansions over the years have resulted in the stadium now being near the center of campus. The stadium officially opened on November 24, 1927. The Tar Heels defeated Davidson College 27-0, with the first touchdown in the new stadium by Edison Foard. The first game at Kenan Stadium brought in 9,000 spectators. It was officially dedicated to the Kenan family on Thanksgiving Day in 1927 in front of 28,000 fans, after the Tar Heels beat the Virginia Cavaliers 14-13.

The original stadium—the lower level of the current stadium's sideline seats—seated 24,000 people.  However, temporary bleachers were added to the end zones to accommodate overflow crowds, allowing Kenan to accommodate over 40,000 people at times.  This happened fairly often over the years, especially during the Choo Choo Justice era of the late 1940s.

The largest crowd to see a game at Kenan—and the largest to see a game on-campus in the state of North Carolina—was a standing-room-only throng of 62,000 when the Tar Heels hosted the Florida State Seminoles in 1997.  The largest paid crowd was a crowd of 62,000 that saw the Tar Heels face Duke in 2013. The 1991 season opener versus Cincinnati and the Clemson game, which was televised nationally by ESPN, were UNC's first true night home games in school history.

The Tar Heels football team sold out every game from 1992 to 1999, and also sold out all but one game of Butch Davis's tenure. Most of the west end zone and three sections of the south stands are reserved for students.  The student section of the west end zone is popularly known as the "Tar Pit"—a name applied to the entire stadium during the late 1990s.

From 2007 to 2010, fireworks were shot from atop Kenan Field House whenever the Tar Heels took the field, as well as after every score and win.  They were removed in 2011, but reinstated in 2012 after Larry Fedora's arrival, and for the next three seasons were shot off behind the west end zone.

Dedication change
William R. Kenan, to whom the stadium was dedicated since its construction in 1927, "was the commander of a white supremacist paramilitary force, which massacred scores of black residents in Wilmington, on a single day in 1898." In 2018 the University decided to remove the plaque on the stadium mentioning him, and to designate the stadium as named for his son William R. Kenan Jr.

Renovations and expansions

The stadium was first expanded in 1963, when Kenan (who died in 1965) donated $1 million to double-deck the sideline seats and add permanent bleachers to the end zones, expanding capacity to 48,000.  A seating adjustment in 1979 boosted capacity to 50,000.  In 1988, the old press box and chancellor's box were replaced by 2,000 seats between the 40-yard lines, expanding capacity to 52,000.

Part of the 1987-88 project were a permanent lighting system, a chancellor's lounge on the north side of the field and a football lettermen's lounge on the south side. The lights are part of a General Electric low-mount system which minimizes the height of the lightpoles. Cost of the entire project was $7 million. It was funded by private gifts and bonds.

The stadium's biggest renovation project to date took place from 1995 to 1998.  Head coach Mack Brown wanted a better facility to showcase a resurgent football program, which had gone from consecutive 1-10 seasons in 1988 and 1989 to a run of success not approached since the 1940s. The stadium was lacking in many areas. For instance, Kenan was one of the few Division I stadiums not to have permanent seating in at least one end zone; the only end zone seats at the time were the portable bleachers added in 1963.  Also, the locker rooms were somewhat cramped by 1990s standards.

Several generous gifts resulted in the addition of a new playing field and a brand-new facility for the football team, the Frank H. Kenan Football Center, named for the great-grandson of the stadium's original benefactor.  The Kenan Center included a memorabilia section showcasing the football program's history. The most visible addition, however, was 8,000 new seats in the west end zone, which turned the stadium into a horseshoe.  Also added was a "preferred seating box" atop the north stands.  Due to state law, only 6,000 of the new end zone seats were available in 1997.  Capacity dropped to 48,500 in 1996, but leaped to 57,800 in 1997.  The other 2,200 seats were added in 1998, bringing the stadium to a capacity of 60,000, not eclipsed until the 2011 season. In 2003, a modern scoreboard with video capability was added in front of Kenan Field House. The next addition came before the 2007 season, when the old matrix boards on the sidelines were replaced with ribbon boards.

In December 2006, the Chapel Hill Town Council approved changes to UNC's development plan that included at least 8,800 additional seats for Kenan Stadium.

In October 2007, athletic director Dick Baddour announced plans for extensive renovations to Kenan Stadium.  Plans called for a new academic support center in place of Kenan Field House, plus anywhere from 5,000 to 15,000 additional seats.  The new seats would be added in the east end zone, turning the stadium into a bowl.  Plans would have to be approved by the chancellor and the board of trustees, and would almost certainly require a fundraising effort by the Rams Club.  No specific timetable was set, but Baddour said that he hoped to begin construction within 18 months.

This "masterplan" was divided into two phases; phase one covering the west end zone and two covering the east end zone.  The first phase consisted of adding a fifth floor (for recruiting and media space) along with remodeling the existing offices and team spaces in the Kenan Football Center.  Approved on July 23, 2008, by the Board of Trustees for $50 million, Phase I renovations were completed on August for the 2009 Football Season.

A third and final phase of the project was also planned. This includes new club-level seats around the perimeter of the stadium, a new suite level above the club seats, a much larger press box, and a brick facade encircling the outside of the stadium. Construction of this phase has not been scheduled, however, due to budgetary constraints.

On May 27, 2010, the University of North Carolina at Chapel Hill Board of Trustees approved the immediate commencement on construction of the "Carolina Student-Athlete Center for Excellence", a $70 million expansion that would replace Kenan Field House. The entire project was funded by private donations and the selling of club seats and individual suites. This facility would be a combination of an academic center, "Carolina Leadership Academy", Olympic sports' strength and conditioning center, and visitor lockers within a span of two floors.

However, the most significantly visible portion of the renovation was the addition of 2,980 seats. The additional seats in the end zone, named the Blue Zone, would be "1,836 seats in the Concourse Club just a few feet from the field, 824 seats in the Upper Club/Loge on the fourth floor and 320 seats in 20 suites on the fifth floor". The individual suites, each of which has 16 seats, will sell for $50,000 per year. Each seat in the club levels range from $750 to $2,500 per season. Furthermore, the construction of a new concourse in front of the Carolina Student-Athlete Center for Excellence would allow fans to move around the entire perimeter of Kenan Stadium for the first time.  The exterior of the new section is similar in appearance to the Bell Tower.

The 2011 renovation and expansion fully enclosed the stadium for the first time in its history. This facility houses the Loudermilk Center for Student Excellence as well as 3,000 additional premium club, suite seating and lounge areas in the east end zone, bringing total stadium capacity to 63,000.  As part of this addition, HD video boards were installed on each end of the stadium. In 2016, new ribbon boards and updated concessions were added.  In 2018, the metal bleachers that had been in place for almost half a century were replaced with individual seats, reducing capacity to 50,500. The stadium switched the playing surface from natural grass to a RootZone synthetic grass surface manufactured by AstroTurf for the 2019 season.

See also
 List of NCAA Division I FBS football stadiums

References

External links

 
 Satellite photo of Kenan Memorial Stadium

American football venues in North Carolina
College football venues
College lacrosse venues in the United States
Lacrosse venues in North Carolina
North Carolina Tar Heels football
North Carolina Tar Heels sports venues
Sports venues completed in 1927
1927 establishments in North Carolina